Étienne Vatelot (13 November 1925 – 13 July 2013) was a French luthier.

Biography 
Étienne Vatelot is the son of luthier Marcel Vatelot, who opened his workshop in 1909, and Jehane Lauxerrois. From 1942, he learned the craft of luthier in the workshop of his father, located at 11 bis  in Paris. He perfected his skills in Mirecourt with luthier Amédée-Dominique Dieudonné, in Paris in the studio of Victor Quenoil, then in New York at Rembert Wurlitzer. In 1949, he obtained the diploma of honor at the International Violin Competition of The Hague (Netherland). In 1959 he was appointed expert witness by the Court of Appeal of Paris and succeeded his father.

Étienne Vatelot used to compare his profession to that of a doctor. He was renowned for his diagnostic capabilities He regulated the instruments of numerous international soloists that he accompanied on tour, like French violinist Ginette Neveu. During his career, he advised Yehudi Menuhin, Arthur Grumiaux, Isaac Stern, Anne-Sophie Mutter, cellists such as Maurice Gendron and Yo-Yo Ma, as well as Mstislav Rostropovich, whom he had known since the 1960s. He advised him to buy the Duport Stradivarius cello which he had appraised. He convinced Yehudi Menuhin to resell his Soil Stradivarius, which he deemed unsuitable for his playing, to Itzhak Perlman. In 1973, he acquired a quartet of stringed instruments made in the same wood by luthier Jean-Baptiste Vuillaume and nicknamed "les Évangélistes". In 2009, he allowed the Swiss Global Artistic Foundation, a patron of the Modigliani quartet, to acquire it so that they could be played together.

In 1970, Étienne Vatelot created the national school of lutherie in Mirecourt. The luthier Jean-Jacques Rampal, son of the flautist Jean-Pierre Rampal and assistant to Étienne Vatelot, took over his workshop in 1998 Étienne Vatelot gave numerous lectures and is the author of a book on Archets français ("French bows"). A foundation in his name was created to support young luthiers and bowmen by giving them scholarships. With the participation of the Paris City Council, he created an international competition for violin and bow making.

Distinctions 
 Commandeur of the Légion d’honneur
 Officier of the Ordre national du Mérite
 Chevalier of the Palmes académiques
 Commandeur of the Ordre des Arts et des Lettres
 Commandeur de l'Order of Isabella the Catholic (after restoring the Stradivarius quartet of the Royal Palace of Madrid)

See also 
 Sound post
 Bow (music)
 Fingerboard
 Musée de la Lutherie et de l'Archèterie françaises

References

External links 
 Concours Étienne Vatelot lutherie et archèterie 2011
 Étienne Vatelot, Paris, 1980
 Vatelot-Rampal: on the art of healing violins
 French violin expert Étienne Vatelot dies aged 87 on The Strad
 VATELOT RAMPAL - Experts String Instrument makers since 1909

1925 births
2013 deaths
People from Provins
Luthiers from Paris
Officers of the Ordre national du Mérite
Commandeurs of the Ordre des Arts et des Lettres
Chevaliers of the Ordre des Palmes Académiques
Commandeurs of the Légion d'honneur
Commanders of the Order of Isabella the Catholic
Luthiers from Mirecourt